Salua is a village, in Kharagpur I CD Block in Kharagpur subdivision of Paschim Medinipur district in the state of West Bengal, India.

Geography

Location

Area overview
Kharagpur subdivision, shown partly in the map alongside, mostly has alluvial soils, except in two CD blocks in the west – Kharagpur I and Keshiary, which mostly have lateritic soils. Around 74% of the total cultivated area is cropped more than once. With a density of population of 787 per km2nearly half of the district’s population resides in this subdivision. 14.33% of the population lives in urban areas and 86.67% lives in the rural areas.

Note: The map alongside presents some of the notable locations in the subdivision. All places marked in the map are linked in the larger full screen map.

Demographics
As per 2011 Census of India Salua had a total population of 4,430 of which 2.463 (56%) were males and 1,967 (44%) were females. Population below 6 years was 515. The total number of literates in Salua was 3,915 (88.37% of the population over 6 years).

.* For language details see Kharagpur I#Language and religion

Transport
SH 5 running from Rupnarayanpur (in Bardhaman district) to Junput (in Purba Medinipur district)  passes through Salua.

Air Force Station
Air Force Station Salua is a radar station of Indian Air Force. It had an air-field during World War II and was in use from 1942 to 1946.

References
	

Villages in Paschim Medinipur district